Ocypete (Ancient Greek: Ὠκυπέτη means 'swift wing') was one of the three Harpies in Greek mythology. She was also known as Ocypode ("swift foot") or Ocythoe ("swift runner"). The Harpies were the daughters of the sea god Thaumas and the Oceanid Electra.

According to one story, the Harpies were chased by the Boreads. Though the swiftest of the trio, Ocypete became exhausted, landed on an island in the middle of the ocean and begged for mercy from the gods. In Greek and Roman mythology, the Harpies were creatures employed by the higher gods to carry out punishments for crimes.

References 
 H. J. Rose (1985). A Handbook of Greek Mythology. University Paperback, 1964.
Hard, Robin, The Routledge Handbook of Greek Mythology: Based on H.J. Rose's "Handbook of Greek Mythology", Psychology Press, 2004, . Google Books.

Greek legendary creatures
Legendary birds
Mythological hybrids

Harpies